Albert Abraham Hemmo (אברהם חמו; born July 8, 1934) is an Israeli former basketball player. He played in the Israeli Basketball Premier League and for the Israel national basketball team.

Biography
Hemmo is 6' 4" (1.93 m), was born in Egypt, and is Jewish. In Egypt, he played basketball for Maccabi Cairo. He immigrated from Egypt to Israel in 1948.

He played 15 seasons in the Israeli Basketball Premier League. During that time Hemmo played for Hapoel Haifa, Hapoel Ramat Gan, Hapoel Gvat, and Hapoel Megido.

Hemmo played for the Israel national basketball team in the 1959 European Championship for Men, 1961 European Championship for Men, 1963 European Championship for Men, and 1964 European Olympic Qualifying Tournament for Men. In 1973-75 he coached the Israeli national basketball team.

He was a policeman in the Israel Police by profession, and ultimately a deputy chief of police in the Yarkon region.

See also
Sports in Israel

References 

1934 births
Egyptian men's basketball players
Israeli men's basketball players
Egyptian Jews
Israeli Jews
Israeli people of Egyptian-Jewish descent
Hapoel Haifa B.C. players
Israeli police officers
Israeli Basketball Premier League players
Living people